Chalice of Steel is a full-length studio album by German metal band Paragon, released in 1999.

Track listing
 "Intro: Awakening of the Beast" - 00:56
 "Dragon's Flight" - 04:18
 "Legions of Metal" - 04:26
 "Chalice of Steel" - 04:56
 "Wheels of Eternity" - 07:11
 "Desecrate" - 04:55
 "Intro: Dark Tale" - 00:42
 "Casting Shadows" - 04:11
 "Burn at the Stake" - 03:22
 "Journey Home" - 06:19
 "A.D. 2000" - 06:05
 "Violence and Force" (Exciter cover) - 04:01

Credits
 Andreas Babuschkin - Lead Vocals
 Martin Christian - Guitars / Backing Vocals 
 Claudius Cremer - Guitars 
 Jan Bünning - Bass / Backing Vocals 
 Markus Corby - Drums

1999 albums
Paragon (band) albums